Myron Demkiw  is a Canadian police officer who has been the chief of police with the Toronto Police Service (TPS) since December 19, 2022.

Early life and education 
Demkiw was born in Toronto, Ontario, to Ukrainian parents. He attended St. Michael’s College School, graduating in 1985, before completing a bachelor’s degree in political science and criminology at the University of Toronto in 1989. In 2019, he returned to the University of Toronto, completing the Global Professional Master of Laws (GPLLM) program in 2020. He is also a graduate of the Police Leadership Program with Rotman School of Management.

Career 
Demkiw joined the Metro Toronto Police in 1990, the year after he completed his bachelor's degree.

Five years into his career in 1995, Demkiw was nearly killed while working in plain clothes by a man who attempted to shoot him with a handgun.

In 2000, he participated in a raid of a lesbian bathhouse, resulting in six Liquor Licence Act charges, which were later dismissed when a court ruled the initial raid unreasonable two years later. Councillor Kyle Rae accused TPS of trying to ogle naked women, and was sued by Demkiw and six fellow officers for defamation. Rae was ordered to pay the officers $170,000. As part of a human rights settlement from that raid in 2004, the Toronto Police Service enhanced efforts to recruit gay officers, adopt a gender-sensitive policy and paid $350,000 to the complainants.

Demkiw became an inspector in 2011, before being promoted to superintendent five years later and staff superintendent in 2018. He held a number of management roles including duty senior officer, unit commander of Intelligence Services, leading Detective Operations, heading Corporate Risk Management, and as second in command of 32 Division. In the wake of the Bruce McArthur serial homicides case, he oversaw the creation of the Missing Persons Unit.

In 2020, he became acting deputy chief of specialized operations command, where he would oversee Public Safety Operations and Detective Operations.

Chief of Police 
On September 15, 2022, the Toronto Police Services Board (TPSB) announced that Demkiw would be the city's next chief of police. He is expected to take office on December 19, 2022, taking over from James Ramer, who served as interim chief for two years following the resignation of Mark Saunders.

References 

Toronto police chiefs
Living people
Canadian people of Ukrainian descent
University of Toronto alumni
Year of birth missing (living people)